The 2017 Missouri Valley Conference men's soccer tournament was the 28th edition of the competition. The tournament was played from November 8 until November 11.

The Central Arkansas Bears won the tournament, defeating Missouri State Bears on a golden goal. The win give the UCA their first ever MVC men's soccer championship, and their berth into the 2017 NCAA Division I men's soccer tournament. In the NCAA Tournament, Central Arkansas was drawn in the first round against the SMU Mustangs. There, they lost to SMU, 2-0.

Background 

The 2017 Missouri Valley Conference Men's Soccer Tournament is the culmination of the regular season. The regular season conference matches determine the seeding in the tournament, which determines the conference's automatic berth into the NCAA Tournament. All teams in the Missouri Valley Conference, or MVC, play each other once during the season. Teams play certain teams at home during even number years, and then will play those teams on the road during odd number years. Teams are awarded three points for a win, a point for a draw and no points for a loss.

In the event that teams are tied on points, the first tiebreaker is head-to-head record. If that tiebreaker is tied, goal differential is applied, followed by goals scored, then away goals, then RPI.

Missouri State won the regular season with a 5-2-1 record.

Seeding

Bracket

Results

Opening round

Quarterfinals

Semifinals

MVC Championship

Statistics

Honors and awards

Most valuable player 
 Niklas Brodacki, Central Arkansas

MVC All-Tournament team

See also 
 2017 Missouri Valley Conference Women's Soccer Tournament

References

External links 
MVC Men's Soccer Championship Central

2017